The Diary is the third studio album by American rapper Scarface. The album was released on October 18, 1994, by Rap-A-Lot and Noo Trybe. This album is one of the few to receive a perfect rating from both The Source Magazine and XXL. The album debuted at #2 on the Billboard 200 albums chart, and was certified Platinum by the RIAA on December 5, 1994.

Two singles were released from the album, "Hand of the Dead Body", which featured Ice Cube and Devin the Dude, peaked at 74 on the US charts, while "I Seen a Man Die" peaked at 37 on the US charts, becoming his first top 40 hit. Due to business reasons and for more accessibility, both track titles were changed to "People Don't Believe" and "Never Seen a Man Cry" in their single version. The song "No Tears" was featured in the beginning of the 1999 film Office Space.

Track listing

Samples
"Goin' Down"
"99 Luftballons" by Nena
"I Seen a Man Die"
"Light My Fire" by Julie Driscoll and Brian Auger and the Trinity
"Jesse James"
"If I Was Your Girlfriend" by Prince

Charts

Weekly charts

Year-end charts

Certifications

References

1994 albums
Scarface (rapper) albums
Rap-A-Lot Records albums
Albums produced by N.O. Joe
Albums produced by Mike Dean (record producer)
Mafioso rap albums